Thatcher is an unincorporated community located in Las Animas County, Colorado, United States.  The U.S. Post Office at Model (ZIP Code 81059) now serves Thatcher postal addresses.

A post office called Thatcher was established in 1883, and remained in operation until 1973.  The community was named after M. D. Thatcher, a local cattleman, after being originally called "Hole-In-The-Rock" after a natural spring discovered in the area.

Geography 
Thatcher is located at  (37.545830,-104.108330).

Notable residents

 Christine Arguello (born 1955), federal judge

References 

Unincorporated communities in Las Animas County, Colorado
Unincorporated communities in Colorado